Mauro Cesar Nunes Bastos (born 6 January 1968) is a Brazilian former professional footballer.

References

1968 births
Living people
Brazilian footballers
Association football forwards
Esporte Clube Juventude players
Atlético Clube Goianiense players
Esporte Clube Vitória players
Clube Esportivo Bento Gonçalves players
C.D. Águila footballers
Brazilian expatriate footballers
Brazilian expatriate sportspeople in El Salvador
Expatriate footballers in El Salvador